This is a list of analysis methods used in materials science. Analysis methods are listed by their acronym, if one exists.

Symbols 
 μSR – see muon spin spectroscopy
 χ – see magnetic susceptibility

A
 AAS – Atomic absorption spectroscopy
 AED – Auger electron diffraction
 AES – Auger electron spectroscopy
 AFM – Atomic force microscopy
 AFS – Atomic fluorescence spectroscopy
 Analytical ultracentrifugation
 APFIM – Atom probe field ion microscopy
 APS – Appearance potential spectroscopy
 ARPES – Angle resolved photoemission spectroscopy
 ARUPS – Angle resolved ultraviolet photoemission spectroscopy
 ATR – Attenuated total reflectance

B
 BET – BET surface area measurement (BET from Brunauer, Emmett, Teller)
 BiFC – Bimolecular fluorescence complementation
 BKD – Backscatter Kikuchi diffraction, see EBSD
 BRET – Bioluminescence resonance energy transfer
 BSED – Back scattered electron diffraction, see EBSD

C
 CAICISS – Coaxial impact collision ion scattering spectroscopy
 CARS – Coherent anti-Stokes Raman spectroscopy
 CBED – Convergent beam electron diffraction
 CCM – Charge collection microscopy
 CDI – Coherent diffraction imaging
 CE – Capillary electrophoresis
 CET – Cryo-electron tomography
 CL – Cathodoluminescence
 CLSM – Confocal laser scanning microscopy
 COSY – Correlation spectroscopy
 Cryo-EM – Cryo-electron microscopy
 Cryo-SEM – Cryo-scanning electron microscopy
 CV – Cyclic voltammetry

D
 DE(T)A – Dielectric thermal analysis
 dHvA – De Haas–van Alphen effect
 DIC – Differential interference contrast microscopy
 Dielectric spectroscopy
 DLS – Dynamic light scattering
 DLTS – Deep-level transient spectroscopy
 DMA – Dynamic mechanical analysis
 DPI – Dual polarisation interferometry
 DRS – Diffuse reflection spectroscopy
 DSC – Differential scanning calorimetry
 DTA – Differential thermal analysis
 DVS – Dynamic vapour sorption

E
 EBIC – Electron beam induced current (see IBIC:  ion beam induced charge)
 EBS – Elastic (non-Rutherford) backscattering spectrometry (see RBS)
 EBSD – Electron backscatter diffraction
 ECOSY – Exclusive correlation spectroscopy
 ECT – Electrical capacitance tomography
 EDAX – Energy-dispersive analysis of x-rays
 EDMR – Electrically detected magnetic resonance, see ESR or EPR
 EDS or EDX – Energy dispersive X-ray spectroscopy
 EELS – Electron energy loss spectroscopy
 EFTEM – Energy filtered transmission electron microscopy
 EID – Electron induced desorption
 EIT and ERT – Electrical impedance tomography and electrical resistivity tomography
 EL – Electroluminescence
 Electron crystallography
 ELS – Electrophoretic light scattering
 ENDOR – Electron nuclear double resonance, see ESR or EPR
 EPMA – Electron probe microanalysis
 EPR – Electron paramagnetic resonance spectroscopy
 ERD or ERDA – Elastic recoil detection or elastic recoil detection analysis
 ESCA – Electron spectroscopy for chemical analysis see XPS
 ESD – Electron stimulated desorption
 ESEM – Environmental scanning electron microscopy
 ESI-MS or ES-MS – Electrospray ionization mass spectrometry or electrospray mass spectrometry
 ESR – Electron spin resonance spectroscopy
 ESTM – Electrochemical scanning tunneling microscopy
 EXAFS – Extended X-ray absorption fine structure
 EXSY – Exchange spectroscopy

F
 FCS – Fluorescence correlation spectroscopy
 FCCS – Fluorescence cross-correlation spectroscopy
 FEM – Field emission microscopy
 FIB – Focused ion beam microscopy
 FIM-AP – Field ion microscopy–atom probe
 Flow birefringence
 Fluorescence anisotropy
 FLIM – Fluorescence lifetime imaging
 Fluorescence microscopy
 FOSPM – Feature-oriented scanning probe microscopy
 FRET – Fluorescence resonance energy transfer
 FRS – Forward Recoil Spectrometry,  a synonym of ERD
 FTICR or FT-MS – Fourier-transform ion cyclotron resonance or Fourier-transform mass spectrometry
 FTIR – Fourier-transform infrared spectroscopy

G
 GC-MS – Gas chromatography-mass spectrometry
 GDMS – Glow discharge mass spectrometry
 GDOS – Glow discharge optical spectroscopy
 GISAXS – Grazing incidence small angle X-ray scattering
 GIXD – Grazing incidence X-ray diffraction
 GIXR – Grazing incidence X-ray reflectivity
 GLC – Gas-liquid chromatography

H
 HAADF – High angle annular dark-field imaging
 HAS – Helium atom scattering
 HPLC – High performance liquid chromatography
 HREELS – High resolution electron energy loss spectroscopy
 HREM – High-resolution electron microscopy
 HRTEM – High-resolution transmission electron microscopy
 HI-ERDA – Heavy-ion elastic recoil detection analysis
 HE-PIXE – High-energy proton induced X-ray emission

I
 IAES – Ion induced Auger electron spectroscopy
 IBA – Ion beam analysis
 IBIC – Ion beam induced charge microscopy
 ICP-AES – Inductively coupled plasma atomic emission spectroscopy
 ICP-MS – Inductively coupled plasma mass spectrometry
 Immunofluorescence
 ICR – Ion cyclotron resonance
 IETS – Inelastic electron tunneling spectroscopy
 IGA – Intelligent gravimetric analysis
 IGF – Inert gas fusion
 IIX – Ion induced X-ray analysis, see particle induced X-ray emission
 INS – Ion neutralization spectroscopy
 Inelastic neutron scattering
 IRNDT – Infrared non-destructive testing of materials
 IRS – Infrared spectroscopy
 ISS – Ion scattering spectroscopy
 ITC – Isothermal titration calorimetry
 IVEM – Intermediate voltage electron microscopy

L
 LALLS – Low-angle laser light scattering
 LC-MS – Liquid chromatography-mass spectrometry
 LEED – Low-energy electron diffraction
 LEEM – Low-energy electron microscopy
 LEIS – Low-energy ion scattering
 LIBS – Laser induced breakdown spectroscopy
 LOES – Laser optical emission spectroscopy
 LS – Light (Raman) scattering

M
 MALDI – Matrix-assisted laser desorption/ionization
 MBE – Molecular beam epitaxy
 MEIS – Medium energy ion scattering
 MFM – Magnetic force microscopy
 MIT – Magnetic induction tomography
 MPM – Multiphoton fluorescence microscopy
 MRFM – Magnetic resonance force microscopy
 MRI – Magnetic resonance imaging
 MS – Mass spectrometry
 MS/MS – Tandem mass spectrometry
 MSGE – Mechanically stimulated gas emission
 Mössbauer spectroscopy
 MTA – Microthermal analysis

N
 NAA – Neutron activation analysis
 ND – Neutron diffraction
 NDP – Neutron depth profiling
 NEXAFS – Near edge X-ray absorption fine structure
 NIS – Nuclear inelastic scattering/absorption
 NMR – Nuclear magnetic resonance spectroscopy
 NOESY – Nuclear Overhauser effect spectroscopy
 NRA – Nuclear reaction analysis
 NSOM – Near-field optical microscopy

O
 OBIC – Optical beam induced current
 ODNMR – Optically detected magnetic resonance, see ESR or EPR
 OES – Optical emission spectroscopy
 Osmometry

P
 PAS – Positron annihilation spectroscopy
 Photoacoustic spectroscopy
 PAT or PACT – Photoacoustic tomography or photoacoustic computed tomography
 PAX – Photoemission of adsorbed xenon
 PC or PCS – Photocurrent spectroscopy
 Phase contrast microscopy
 PhD – Photoelectron diffraction
 PD – Photodesorption
 PDEIS – Potentiodynamic electrochemical impedance spectroscopy
 PDS – Photothermal deflection spectroscopy
 PED – Photoelectron diffraction
 PEELS – parallel electron energy loss spectroscopy
 PEEM – Photoemission electron microscopy (or photoelectron emission microscopy)
 PES – Photoelectron spectroscopy
 PINEM – photon-induced near-field electron microscopy
 PIGE – Particle (or proton) induced gamma-ray spectroscopy,  see nuclear reaction analysis
 PIXE – Particle (or proton) induced X-ray spectroscopy
 PL – Photoluminescence
 Porosimetry
 Powder diffraction
 PTMS – Photothermal microspectroscopy
 PTS – Photothermal spectroscopy

Q
 QENS – Quasielastic neutron scattering
 QCM-D – Quartz crystal microbalance with dissipation monitoring

R
 Raman spectroscopy
 RAXRS – Resonant anomalous X-ray scattering
 RBS – Rutherford backscattering spectrometry
 REM – Reflection electron microscopy
 RDS – Reflectance difference spectroscopy
 RHEED – Reflection high energy electron diffraction
 RIMS – Resonance ionization mass spectrometry
 RIXS – Resonant inelastic X-ray scattering
 RR spectroscopy – Resonance Raman spectroscopy

S
 SAD – Selected area diffraction
 SAED – Selected area electron diffraction
 SAM – Scanning Auger microscopy
 SANS – Small angle neutron scattering
 SAXS – Small angle X-ray scattering
 SCANIIR – Surface composition by analysis of neutral species and ion-impact radiation
 SCEM – Scanning confocal electron microscopy
 SE – Spectroscopic ellipsometry
 SEC – Size exclusion chromatography
 SEIRA – Surface enhanced infrared absorption spectroscopy
 SEM – Scanning electron microscopy
 SERS – Surface enhanced Raman spectroscopy
 SERRS – Surface enhanced resonance Raman spectroscopy
 SESANS – Spin Echo Small Angle Neutron Scattering
 SEXAFS – Surface extended X-ray absorption fine structure
 SICM – Scanning ion-conductance microscopy
 SIL – Solid immersion lens
 SIM – Solid immersion mirror
 SIMS – Secondary ion mass spectrometry
 SNMS – Sputtered neutral species mass spectrometry
 SNOM – Scanning near-field optical microscopy
 SPECT – Single-photon emission computed tomography
 SPM – Scanning probe microscopy
 SRM-CE/MS – Selected-reaction-monitoring capillary-electrophoresis mass-spectrometry
 SSNMR – Solid-state nuclear magnetic resonance
 Stark spectroscopy
 STED – Stimulated emission depletion microscopy
 STEM – Scanning transmission electron microscopy
 STM – Scanning tunneling microscopy
 STS – Scanning tunneling spectroscopy
 SXRD – Surface X-ray diffraction

T
 TAT or TACT – Thermoacoustic tomography or thermoacoustic computed tomography (see also photoacoustic tomography – PAT)
 TEM – Transmission electron microscopy
 TGA – Thermogravimetric analysis
 TIKA – Transmitting ion kinetic analysis
 TIMS – Thermal ionization mass spectrometry
 TIRFM – Total internal reflection fluorescence microscopy
 TLS – Photothermal lens spectroscopy, a type of photothermal spectroscopy
 TMA – Thermomechanical analysis
 TOF-MS – Time-of-flight mass spectrometry
 Two-photon excitation microscopy
 TXRF – Total reflection X-ray fluorescence analysis

U
 Ultrasound attenuation spectroscopy
 UPS – UV-photoelectron spectroscopy
 USANS – Ultra small-angle neutron scattering
 USAXS – Ultra small-angle X-ray scattering
 UT – Ultrasonic testing
 UV-Vis – Ultraviolet–visible spectroscopy

V
 VEDIC – Video-enhanced differential interference contrast microscopy
 Voltammetry

W
 WAXS – Wide angle X-ray scattering
 WDX or WDS – Wavelength dispersive X-ray spectroscopy

X
 XAES – X-ray induced Auger electron spectroscopy
 XANES – XANES, synonymous with NEXAFS (near edge X-ray absorption fine structure)
 XAS – X-ray absorption spectroscopy
 X-CTR – X-ray crystal truncation rod scattering
 X-ray crystallography
 XDS – X-ray diffuse scattering
 XPEEM – X-ray photoelectron emission microscopy
 XPS – X-ray photoelectron spectroscopy
 XRD – X-ray diffraction
 XRES – X-ray resonant exchange scattering
 XRF – X-ray fluorescence analysis
 XRR – X-ray reflectivity
 XRS – X-ray Raman scattering
 XSW – X-ray standing wave technique

See also
 Characterization (materials science)

References
 
 

Materials analysis methods
Analytical chemistry
Materials analysis methods
Materials analysis methods